The City of Birmingham Rockets are an English basketball club, based in the city of Birmingham, West Midlands.

History
The club was formed in 2003 as the City of Birmingham Basketball Club.

The founders of the club were looking to provide regular opportunities and a clear pathway for young people from Birmingham and the surrounding areas to play basketball. The club runs representative teams at various age levels from Under-11s through to seniors, based in one of the most deprived wards in the country, with participants drawn from all parts of the city.

The senior men's team entered the English Basketball League in 2014. The volunteer-led organisation's name was then changed to the City of Birmingham Rockets in August 2017 to recognise a partnership set up with Houston Rockets and NBA legend Hakeem Olajuwon.

Despite spending most of their existence with a focus on youth development and competing in the lower divisions of the English Basketball League, with new backing it has been mooted that the Rockets could join the British Basketball League
 in the near future; however, these plans appear to be hold at least for the 2019–20 season.

The Rockets' home venue was refurbished in 2021 with funding from 2K, the American video game company behind the NBA 2K game series.

Players
Notable former players

 Myles Hesson
 Kofi Josephs

Season-by-season records

References

Basketball teams in England